Doug Tietjens (born 7 February 1984) is a former Australian-born New Zealand rugby union player who last played as a flanker for Taranaki in the National Provincial Championship, having shifted north to the province after 45 matches with Manawatu from 2008 to 2012.

Domestic career 

Although he was born in Australia, Tietjens grew up in New Zealand and attended school in Palmerston North. He moved south to attend the University of Otago in 2004, and was selected to Otago B sides in 2006 and 2007 but never played for the full Otago provincial squad.

Returning north in 2008, Tietjens cracked the Manawatu squad for the 2008 Air New Zealand Cup. He continues as a solid squad player for the Turbos for the next few seasons, before having a breakout year in the 2011 ITM Cup, scoring 4 tries for a vastly improved side.

Tietjens missed the entire 2012 ITM Cup after suffering a major knee injury while playing Super Rugby. For the 2013 ITM Cup, Tietjens moved to Taranaki and made 8 appearances in his comeback from serious injury.

Super Rugby

After his strong season with Manawatu in 2011, Tietjens was signed by the Highlanders for the 2012 Super Rugby season. He made 6 appearances for the club before his season was ended prematurely by a serious knee injury.

References

External links
Manawatu Profile

1984 births
Highlanders (rugby union) players
Living people
New Zealand rugby union players
Manawatu rugby union players
Taranaki rugby union players
Rugby union players from Palmerston North
People educated at Palmerston North Boys' High School
Rugby union flankers